The Curl Mesabi Classic (previously known as the Curl Mesabi Cash Spiel (2007, 2010-2011), Iron Trail Motors Shoot-Out @ Curl Mesabi (2012) and the Super One Shoot-out @ Curl Mesabi (2008)) is an annual bonspiel, or curling tournament, that takes place at Curl Mesabi's venue, the Range Recreation and Civic Center, in Eveleth, Minnesota. The tournament is held in a round-robin format. The men's tournament, started c. 2003, and joined the World Curling Tour in 2007. Women were allowed to participate in the men's tournament until 2011, when a separate women's tournament was created. The women's event was not held in 2013. The event is part of the United States Order of Merit System, used to determine the teams which will directly qualify to the National Championships each year. The bonspiel is also part of the Great Lakes Curling Tour. The event's coordinator is Phill Drobnick. 

In 2022, the winning teams earned a bye to the US National Championships.

Past champions
''Only skip's name is displayed.

Men

Women

Notes

References

External links
Bonspiel Home
Curl Mesabi Home

World Curling Tour events
Women's World Curling Tour events
Curling in Minnesota
Events in St. Louis County, Minnesota
Ontario Curling Tour events
2007 establishments in Minnesota
Recurring sporting events established in 2007